Moscow Governorate, or the Government of Moscow, was an administrative division (a guberniya) of the Tsardom of Russia, the Russian Empire, and the Russian SFSR, which existed in 1708–1929.

Administrative division
Moscow Governorate consisted of 13 uyezds (their administrative centres in brackets):
 Bogorodsky Uyezd (Bogorodsk/Noginsk)
 Bronnitsky Uyezd (Bronnitsy)
 Vereysky Uyezd (Vereya)
 Volokolamsky Uyezd (Volokolamsk)
 Dmitrovsky Uyezd (Dmitrov)
 Zvenigorodsky Uyezd (Zvenigorod)
 Klinsky Uyezd (Klin)
 Kolomensky Uyezd (Kolomna)
 Mozhaysky Uyezd (Mozhaysk)
 Moskovsky Uyezd (Moscow)
 Podolsky Uyezd (Podolsk)
 Ruzsky Uyezd (Ruza)
 Serpukhovsky Uyezd (Serpukhov)

History
As with the rest of the governorates, initially, neither the borders nor internal subdivisions of Moscow Governorate were defined; instead, the territory was defined as a set of cities and the lands adjacent to those cities. Later, Moscow Governorate was subdivided into 13 uyezds.

The governorate underwent numerous changes in the following years, and was finally abolished on January 14, 1929 when modern Moscow Oblast was created.

Demography

Language
Population by mother tongue according to the Imperial census of 1897.

Religion
According to the Imperial census of 1897.

References

Further reading
 
 

 
States and territories established in 1708
States and territories disestablished in 1929
Governorates of the Russian Soviet Federative Socialist Republic
1708 establishments in Russia
18th century in Moscow
19th century in Moscow
1929 disestablishments in Russia
Governorates of the Russian Empire
History of Moscow Oblast
History of Moscow